Waconda is a historic unincorporated community in Marion County, Oregon, United States, near the crossroads of River Road and Waconda Road. Waconda was once a station on the Oregon Electric Railway and formerly had a post office by the same name.

Name
In the Kanza language, the name "Waconda" translates as "spirit water" or "Great Spirit Spring". In the Siouan language, the name "Waconda" translates as "consecrated place".

History

On French Prairie, a prairie located in Marion County, Oregon, United States, there are two Wacondas: an old Waconda (about 1856 to 1871) that flourished on the stage route, about one mile south of Gervais, Oregon; and Waconda Station on the Oregon Electric Railway, which opened in January 1908. These Wacondas are approximately 4 miles apart, with the current unincorporated community of Waconda remaining the latter.

Old Waconda was located approximately 1 mile south of modern Gervais, Oregon, at the crossroads of the Oregon Stage Coach Road (current day Highway 99E), Parkersville-Fairfield Road (current day Duck Inn Road, East of Highway 99E) and Keene, West of Highway 99E. These two roads were important commerce roads, with the Parkersville-Fairfield Road a westerly road, moved lumber and agriculture products from the Parkersville area to Fairfield; the latter,  located on the Willamette River, was an important shipping port on the river. The Oregon Stage Coach Road, descending within a southern direction, was the major road from Portland, Oregon to Salem, Oregon, continuing onward to California. Although the town no longer exists, the current Marion County tax maps still show the plat of Waconda.

On May 7, 1856, John H. Feaster, a blacksmith, purchased 100 acres for $18.00 per acre from William Larkin, part of the original William Larkin land claim of 1850. The land, located within Marion County, Oregon, coincides with the county within which the currently nonexistent town of Waconda remained located.

Stagecoach stop
Waconda was established as a stage coach stop in 1857, as the site was perfect for a stagecoach stop. A stagecoach changed horses with Aurora Colony, located 12 miles north and Salem, located 12 miles south; stagecoach stations remained similarly placed at intervals of 12 miles. The cost of a ticket from Portland to Waconda was $4.00, while the cost of a ticket from Waconda to Salem was $1.00. Even in the rainy Willamette Valley, water was sometimes hard to find; however, in Waconda, a continuous annual spring allowed for the provision of water to stagecoach horses.

Platting and lot sale

Waconda was platted on September 3, 1866 by John and Martha Feaster, with Elias Magers and J. W. Smith as witnesses and S. D. Snowden as the surveyor. Waconda streets were never named, with several of the blocks remaining integrated. The streets and alleys were vacated in 1943.

John Feaster, responsible for the platting of the town, desired to witness its development into a major town.  In 1862, prior to the aforementioned event, he began selling lots for houses and businesses.As a special incentive for settlement in Waconda, Feaster offered a lot for free to a store, hotel keeper or blacksmith, on the condition that they remained proficient, would erect a "respectable" building and would initiate a business.

The Baptist denomination within the region initiated the construction of a church, following the provision of a deed upon November 6, 1865; trustees of the French Prairie Missionary Baptist Church included John D. Garrett, William B. Magers and Sanford Stevens.

Hotels
Waconda had two hotels that stood on the west side of what is now Highway 99E. Anton Adelman (1911 to 1999), as a youngster with others of his age, toasted wieners in a large fireplace which once warmed guests within the hotel.

Brewery
The town became the residence of the Glaser and Kirn Brewery beginning sometime in the 1860s; the brewery was owned by Gustave Glaser and Fredrick Kirn, born in Wurttemburg and Wert, Germany, respectively. The site was called Brewery Hill; beneath this one-story brewery was the aging cellar, where good keg beer was kept until ready for distribution, while above the brewery was a bar, where alcohol was dispensed at 5 cents for a large glass. It brewed 129 barrels of beer in 1879; the beer was black, contained large quantities of hops and was potent. The source of water was an excellent spring at the bottom of the hill, next to the modern Farmers Creek, which provided water for the entirety of the year. The brewery was a victim of fires twice with the second instance occurring on Sunday morning, January 24, 1892. 4500 bushels of barley, the ice house and the entirety of the brewing machinery were consumed; the total loss was put at $14,000, with $1,000 insured. The brewery was not rebuilt.

Waconda School
A school was a necessity in any town and Waconda was no exception. According to records in the Marion County School Office, a schoolhouse was built in 1852, located just south of Waconda on the Rondeau Donation Land Claim; the location was just off of the current Highway 99E along its eastern side, at the edge of an oak grove. From records in the Marion County Office, the value of this schoolhouse was $300.00. (45.089253-122.909652) Today, the property is owned by the Adelman Family.

The schoolhouse was described in Sarah Hunt Steeves' Book of Remembrance, based on accounts from W. T. Ridgon:

This school house was used until 1873, when a new school was built on the S. W. R. Jones property, on what is the modern Highway 99E. The school is now known as the Pioneer School, District 13.

Post office
A U.S. Post Office opened on March 23, 1864. It closed on November 6, 1871 and was moved to Gervais, Oregon. John H. Feaster was the first postmaster (March 23, 1864 to March 19, 1867), followed by Truman Bonney (March 19, 1867 to August 15, 1867), Charles Calvert (August 15, 1867 to July 15, 1869), Moses Levy (July 15, 1869 to January 4, 1871) and John C. Mayes  (January 4, 1871 to November 6, 1871). The Pacific Coast Business Directory for 1867 relates that, within the same year, Charles Calvert was the postmaster and general merchant. Both John Feaster and G.S. Johnson are listed as village blacksmiths, with W.B. Magers and J.H. Matterson listed as local physicians, S.D. Snowden as town surveyor and Richard Enes as a wagon maker.

1870 census
The census of 1870 was of the Waconda Township. It showed a population of 235, 50 dwellings, and 33 property owners. The average age was 21.8 years. According to the census the town had three physicians, one teacher, one butcher, two merchants, two wagon makers, two saloon keeper, two saddlers, one druggist, three blacksmiths, one harness maker, one stable keeper and twenty-one farmers.

Telegraph station
Waconda was made a station on the line of the State Telegraph Company in April 1867.  An operator was sent or employed from among the citizens of Waconda.

Advertisements and news in the area newspapers about Waconda

This locality affords an immediate view of the "perpetual snow" responsible for covering Mount Hood. The town of Waconda had one family physician, one storekeeper, one surveyor, one lawyer, one blacksmith shop, one wagon maker, one plow maker, one brick maker, one meat market and three carpenters The annual session of this Association was held last week at Waconda, commencing on Thursday, the 8th instant. The attendance this year was large, with delegates from nearly every church of that denomination in the State being present.

Dentistry:

We call the attention of our readers at Waconda to the fact that Mr. T.L. Nicklin will soon visit their town to practice dentistry for those who stand in need of his services. We can commend Mr. Nicklin to their attention and patronage, and do so with pleasure.

Attorney:

F. O. McCown, Attorney and Counsellor at Law. Office with Dr. W. B. Magers, Waconda, Marion County, Oregon.

Marriages:

Married—At the residence of the bride's father, in Waconda. Marion County,Oregon, Oct. 13, by Elder T. M. Martin of Salem, Dr. W. A. Cusick to Miss Marcia A. Williams, both of Waconda.

The beginnings of a ghost town

In the late 1860s, a railroad was being built, starting in Portland, working to the south through the Willamette Valley and continuing onto Salem and beyond. By 1870, the railroad was built as far south as Waconda. Because it was already an established town, one would expect the establishment of a station at the town; however, the railroad was approximately 0.25 miles west of the town of Waconda. A common practice at the time was for the adjacent land owner to donate a small quantity of their land to the railroad, for the construction of a depot. They could then sell lots for houses and business, as they owned the surrounding property. Many towns in the Willamette Valley were established by this practice, such as Hubbard and Woodburn.

In Waconda, the adjacent land owners were interested in donating land to the railroad. However, Samuel Brown convinced the railroad that his property was better than the Waconda property, donating some of his land approximately 1 mile to the north of Waconda. The 1853-54 territorial legislature granted a charter for a railroad through the Willamette Valley, with Samuel Brown as a charter member; however, the plans were abandoned due to financial issues. Concomitantly, the town of Gervais was platted and a railroad station was established; Gervais became the business hub of the area. The citizens of Waconda slowly began to move to Gervais and other towns in the area, with several of the homes in Waconda put on skids and pulled to Gervais by teams of horses.

Development in later years

In the years following the previous developments, the town site was eventually purchased by several individuals; these included: George and Melissa Settlemire, the latter of which was a brother of Jesse Settlemire, who founded Woodburn; William and Charlotte Walker; Sarah Paris, a widow; and Henry and Margaret Woolery.  These families converted the area back into family farms.

Beginning in 1904, with additional purchases in later years, the Adelman Families starting with John (1855 to 1941), Frank Sr. (1879 to 1975), Frank Jr. (1906 to 2001) and Anton (1911 to 1999), had purchased all the land at the site of Waconda.

References

External links
Historic images of Waconda from Salem Public Library 
 

Unincorporated communities in Marion County, Oregon
Unincorporated communities in Oregon
Oregon placenames of Native American origin